Charles Cumberland may refer to:

 Charles Cumberland (English cricketer) (1764–1835), English cricketer
 Charles Cumberland (Australian cricketer) (1801–1882), Australian cricketer